The 1989 Mississippi College Choctaws football team was an American football team that represented Mississippi College in the Gulf South Conference (GSC) during the 1989 NCAA Division II football season. In their 18th season under head coach John M. Williams, the Choctaws compiled an 11–3 record (6–2 against conference opponents) and outscored opponents by a total of 376 to 160. 

The team advanced to the NCAA Division II playoff, ultimately defeating Jacksonville State in the national championship game. It was the school's only national football championship. However, in January 1993, the NCAA vacated the national championship after concluding that the program had gained a "tremendous competitive advantage" based on multiple violations, including awarding twice as many scholarships as was allowed, providing extra benefits to student-athletes, and allowing 12 "partial qualifiers" to participate in practice sessions with the football team on a routine basis.

Schedule

References

Mississippi College
Mississippi College Choctaws football seasons
Mississippi College Choctaws football